Glenn Murray Glass (born February 16, 1940) is a former American football defensive back who played five seasons in the National Football League (NFL) with the Pittsburgh Steelers, Philadelphia Eagles and Atlanta Falcons. He was drafted by the Chicago Bears in the 17th round of the 1962 NFL Draft. He was also drafted by the Buffalo Bills in the second round of the 1962 AFL Draft. Glass played college football at the University of Tennessee. He previously attended Clewiston High School in Clewiston, Florida.  He was also a member of the Denver Broncos of the American Football League.

References

External links
Just Sports Stats
College stats

Living people
1940 births
Players of American football from Florida
Sportspeople from Greater Orlando
American football defensive backs
Tennessee Volunteers football players
Pittsburgh Steelers players
Philadelphia Eagles players
Atlanta Falcons players
Denver Broncos (AFL) players
People from Osceola County, Florida